Benedikt "Benni" Magnússon (born 4 June 1983) is an Icelandic strongman and powerlifter.

Strongman and powerlifting career
Benedikt formerly held the world record for the Hummer tire deadlift of 500 kg (1102 lb) at the Arnold Strongman Classic, in which hummer tires are used instead of powerlifting plates under strongman rules where lifting straps are allowed. Benedikt finished fifth at the Arnold Strongman Classic in 2006 & 2008, and was winner of Iceland's Strongest Man in 2003 as well as runner up in 2004 and recently in 2010.

Benedikt is the current WPO powerlifting world record holder in the deadlift. He lifted  in 2005 in Helsinki. He currently holds the Log Lift Icelandic Record, standing at 180 kg (397 lb). He had the strongman deadlift world record, lifting 460 kg (1015 lb) at MHP's Clash of the Titan's IV (Ronnie Coleman classic) on 2 April 2011.

Benedikt lays out his training routine leading up to his 460 kg (1015 lb) deadlift in two simple steps, starting with the pre-conditioning phase and ending with the muscle-building phase. Between the two phases, he would spend 4–6 days in the gym per week. He is currently sponsored by online sports nutrition brand Myprotein.

After his absence from competing due to injury and the following rehabilitation, Benedikt returned and broke the Strongman Deadlift World Record at the Giants Live Strongman competition in Melbourne, Australia by deadlifting 445 kg (981 pounds) RAW with straps.

After only eight weeks of training due to an operation to re-attach a finger tendon, Benedikt broke his own strongman deadlift world record at the World Deadlift Championships at Europe's Strongest Man 2014 with a lift of 461 kg (1016 lbs) on a standard bar and plates.

Benedikt then went on to compete in the World Deadlift Championships at Europe's Strongest Man 2016, lifting 465 kg (1025 pounds)  to equal the strongman world record deadlift on a standard bar, with standard plates, which had been set moments earlier by Eddie Hall. Eddie Hall then went on to be the first person to deadlift 500 kg (1102 pounds), which Benedikt Magnusson attempted also, but was unsuccessful.

Personal life
Benedikt is the brother of fellow Iceland's Strongest Man winner Magnús Magnússon.

Benedikt and Britain's Strongest Woman winner ex wife Gemma Taylor co-owned a heavy lifting gym in Iceland called Super Gym, which ran monthly "raw" (without the aid of lifting suits) competitions including Log Lift Max, Deadlift Max, Rolling Thunder Max, Bench Press Max, and Squat Max.

Personal records

Powerlifting competition records
Done in official powerlifting full meets

Squat - 420 kg (937.7 lbs) 
Bench press - 220 kg (485 lbs) raw
Deadlift - 461 kg (1016 lbs) 
Total = 1042.5 kg (380/220/442.5) / 2298.3 lbs (837.7/485/975.5) raw with wraps

Done in Strongman
Deadlift - 465 kg (1025 lbs) (2016 World Deadlift Championships)

See also
List of strongmen

References

External links
Benedikt Magnusson breaking the tire deadlift record under WPO powerlifting rules
Benedikt Magnusson powerlifting results from IPF competitions

1983 births
Icelandic strength athletes
Living people
Icelandic powerlifters